Joshua Sales (born August 10, 1987) is an American multi-instrumentalist, songwriter, and session musician. Since 2014, he has played drums for Sam Hunt.

Drumming career
Sales moved to Nashville, TN in 2011. In late 2013, Sales got a call from Sam Hunt's team to get together. After talking, Sales was added on as Sam Hunt's full-time drummer.

In 2019, Sales played with Baylee Littrell, as opening act for the Backstreet Boys DNA World Tour.

Since moving to Nashville, Sales has played on sessions for Sam Hunt and Dustin Lynch.

Collaborations 
With Sam Hunt
 Montevallo (MCA Nashville, 2014)
 Southside (MCA Nashville, 2020)

With Dustin Lynch
 Current Mood (Broken Bow Records, 2016)
 Tullahoma (Broken Bow Records, 2020)

Music industry and endorsements 

Sales's distinctive style has awarded him endorsements by musical equipment companies, Drum Workshop drums and hardware, Zildjian cymbals, Pro-Mark drumsticks, and Evans Drumheads.

Notable events
Late Show with David Letterman
Jimmy Kimmel Tonight 
The Voice
Ellen
Seth Meyers
The Tonight Show with Jimmy Fallon
Dick Clark's Rockin New Years Eve Special 2019

References

External links
 

American session musicians
American male drummers
1987 births
Musicians from Indianapolis
Living people
Songwriters from Indiana
21st-century American drummers
21st-century American male musicians
American male songwriters